The Prosecutor General of South Korea is the head of the Supreme Prosecutors' Office of the Republic of Korea.

Duties 
The duties are mentioned under the "Prosecutors' Office Act" enacted since 10 March 1993.

Since 31 December 1988, the term is set to two years and cannot be extended according to article 12(3) of the Act. In case of any issues i.e. sick, on leave, resignation and/or death, the assistant prosecutor general will take the position as the interim.

List of prosecutors general 
Notes: Italics are interims.

See also 
 Supreme Prosecutors' Office of the Republic of Korea

Notes

References

External links 
 Supreme Prosecutors' Office